The 2014–15 season is Hapoel Tel Aviv Football Club's 87th years in the Israeli Football.

Squad report
The team started the season with Asi Domb as coach.  After finishing at the 4th place the previous Ligat Winner season, Hapoel Tel Aviv is Playning on Europe League.

Transfers
The team so far signed Shlomi Azulay, Sari Falah, Francis Benjamin, Tom Almadon, Obeida Khattab, Aviv Dado, Shoval Gozlan, Harmony Ikande and Ariel Lazmi,

Omer Peretz, Gal Malka and Branko Ilić Release from Hapoel tel Aviv. Omer Damari Leave to Austria Wien for approximately 1.7m$ and Itay Shechter moves to FC Nantes for 400thousands euros. In addition Boris Klaiman left in favour of Beitar Jerusalem.

Current squad
As of 23 September 2014.

Foreigners 2014–15
Only up to five non-Israeli nationals can be in an Israeli club squad. Those with Jewish ancestry, married to an Israeli, or have played in Israel for an extended period of time, can claim a passport or permanent residency which would allow them to play with Israeli status.

  Jürgen Colin
  Harmony Ikande
  Lucas Sasha
  Gaël Etock

Coaching staff

{| class="wikitable"
|-
!Position
!Staff
|-
|General Manager|| Eyel Berkovich
|-
|First-team manager|| Asi Domb
|-
|Goalkeeper Trainer|| Yom-tov Talias
|-
|Fitness Trainer|| Dror Shimshoni
|-
|Equipment Manager|| Mordi Dadun
|-
|Club doctor|| Dr. Moshe Lweinkoff
|-
|Physio|| Ronen Tzafrir
|-
|Physio|| Gili Poterman
|-
|Head scout|| Ya'akov Hillel
|-
|President of Youth Department|| Meir Orenstein
|-
|Director of Youth|| Ze'ev Seltzer
|-
|Youth coach|| Morris Jano
|-
|Youth coach's assistant|| Rafi Samuel
|-

Premier league

Results by round

Matches

UEFA Europa League

Play-off round

Hapoel Tel Aviv lost 3–1 on aggregate.

Toto Cup

Group B

See also
 2014–15 UEFA Europa League
 2014–15 Toto Cup Al

References

Hapoel Tel Aviv F.C. seasons
Hapoel Tel Aviv
Hapoel Tel Aviv